Posyolok imeni Frunze is a rural locality (a settlement) in Sergeikhinskoye Rural Settlement, Kameshkovsky District, Vladimir Oblast, Russia. The population was 64 as of 2010.

Geography 
The settlement is located on the Pechuga River, 23 km west of Kameshkovo (the district's administrative centre) by road. Kruglovo is the nearest rural locality.

References 

Rural localities in Kameshkovsky District